Rodney Johnson may refer to:

 Rodney L. Johnson (born 1955), United States Army general
 Rodney Joseph Johnson (1965–2006), Houston Police officer
 Rodney Van Johnson (born 1961), African-American actor
 Rodney Johnson (sport shooter) (1927–2016), Australian Olympic shooter

See also
 Rod Johnson (disambiguation)